Sukhjit Singh may refer to 
 Sukhjit Singh (cricketer)
 Sukhjit Singh (field hockey)
 Sukhjit Singh Kaka Lohgarh, politician and former MLA from Dharamkot, Punjab
 Sukhjit Singh (soldier)